The 2016–17 Boston Pride season was the second in franchise history.

Offseason
During the offseason the Pride moved the Warrior Ice Arena which is also the home to the Boston Bruins from the Bright-Landry Hockey Center where they won the 2016 Isobel Championship. Newly acquired Alex Carpenter signed with the Boston Pride for a one-year, $19,500 contract, making her the highest paid player of the 2015 NWHL Draft class.

Regular season

Game log

|- bgcolor="#cfc"
| 1 || Oct 7 || 7:30 PM || Boston Pride || 4–1 || Buffalo Beauts || HarborCenter || 1–0–0 || 2
|- bgcolor="#cfc"
| 2 || Oct 8 || 7:30 PM || New York Riveters || 3–6 || Boston Pride || Warrior Ice Arena ||2–0–0 || 4 
|- bgcolor="#cfc"
| 3 || Oct 15 || 6:30 PM || Buffalo Beauts || 1–2 || Boston Pride || Warrior Ice Arena || 3–0–0 || 6 
|- bgcolor="#cfc"
| 4 || Oct 22 || 6:30 PM || New York Riveters ||1–5 || Boston Pride || Warrior Ice Arena || 4–0–0 || 8 
|- bgcolor="#cfc"
| 5 || Nov 12 || 6:30 PM || Connecticut Whale || 0–3 || Boston Pride || Warrior Ice Arena || 5–0–0 || 10
|- bgcolor="#cfc"
| 6 || Nov 20 || 3:30 PM || Boston Pride || 5–0 || Buffalo Beauts || HarborCenter || 6–0–0 || 12
|- bgcolor="#cfc"
| 7 || Dec 3 || 7:30 PM || Connecticut Whale || 2–5 || Boston Pride || Warrior Ice Arena || 7–0–0 || 14
|- bgcolor="#cfc"
| 8 || Dec 4 || 4:00 PM || Boston Pride || 3–2 (SO) || New York Riveters || Prudential Center Practice Facility || 8–0–0 || 16
|- bgcolor="#cfc"
| 9 || Jan 15 || 3:30 PM || Boston Pride || 4–0 || Connecticut Whale || Northford Ice Pavilion || 9–0–0 || 18
|- bgcolor="#cfc"
| 10 || Jan 21 || 6:00 PM || Boston Pride || 2–1 || New York Riveters || Prudential Center Practice Facility || 10–0–0 || 20
|- bgcolor="#cfc"
| 11 || Jan 27 || 7:30 PM || Boston Pride || 8–4 || Connecticut Whale || Northford Ice Pavilion || 11–0–0 || 22
|- bgcolor="#cfc"
| 12 || Feb 4 || 7:30 PM || Connecticut Whale || 2–5 || Boston Pride || Warrior Ice Arena || 12–0–0 || 24
|- bgcolor="#cfc"
| 13 || Feb 18 || 6:30 PM || Buffalo Beauts || 1–3 || Boston Pride || Warrior Ice Arena || 13–0–0 || 26
|- bgcolor="#cfc"
| 14 || Feb 24 || 7:30 PM || Boston Pride || 5–4 || Connecticut Whale || Northford Ice Pavilion || 14–0–0 || 28
|- bgcolor="#cfc"
| 15 || Mar 4 || 6:30 PM || New York Riveters || 3–4 || Boston Pride || Warrior Ice Arena || 15–0–0 || 30
|- bgcolor="#cfc"
| 16 || Mar 5 || 5:30 PM || Buffalo Beauts || 1–7 || Boston Pride || Warrior Ice Arena || 16–0–0 || 32
|- bgcolor="#fcc"
| 17 || Mar 12 || 4:00 PM || Boston Pride || 2–3 || New York Riveters || Prudential Center Practice Facility || 16–1–0 || 32

|- style="text-align:center;"
|

Playoffs

|- bgcolor="#cfc"
| 1 || Mar 16 || 7:30 PM || Connecticut Whale || 2–8 || Boston Pride || Warrior Ice Arena
|- bgcolor="#fcc"
| 2 || Mar 19 || 6:00 PM || Buffalo Beauts || 3–2 || Boston Pride || Tsongas Arena
|-

|- style="text-align:center;"
|

Roster
Updated July 18, 2016

|}

Transactions

Trades

Free agents

Signings

Draft

The following were the Pride selections in the 2016 NWHL Draft on June 18, 2016.

References

Boston Pride
2016–17 NWHL season by team
Boston Pride
Boston Pride